Heidy Francisca Salazar Tejeda (born 25 August 1985) is a Dominican former footballer who played as a goalkeeper. She has been a member of the Dominican Republic women's national team.

International career
Salazar capped for the Dominican Republic at senior level during the 2010 CONCACAF Women's World Cup Qualifying qualification and the 2012 CONCACAF Women's Olympic Qualifying Tournament (and its qualifying).

References 

1985 births
Living people
Dominican Republic women's footballers
Women's association football goalkeepers
Dominican Republic women's international footballers